Albert François Cevert Goldenberg (25 February 1944 – 6 October 1973) was a French racing driver who took part in the Formula One World Championship. He competed in 48 World Championship Grands Prix, achieving one win, 13 podium finishes and 89 career points.

Family background
Cevert was the son of Charles Goldenberg (1901–1985), a Parisian jeweller, and Huguette Cevert. Charles was a Russian-Jewish émigré brought to France as a young boy by his parents, to escape the persecution of the Jews under the Tsarist autocracy. During World War II, under the Nazi occupation of France, Goldenberg joined the French Resistance to avoid forced deportation to Poland, as he was a registered Jew. In order not to draw further attention, Charles and Huguette's four children were all registered with her surname (Cevert) rather than his. Some years after the liberation of France, Cevert's father wanted to rename his children back to Goldenberg, but the family objected as by now they had become known as Cevert.

Cevert was the brother-in-law of Grand Prix driver Jean-Pierre Beltoise.

Career

Early career
When he was 16, François Cevert began his motorsport career on two wheels, rather than four, initially racing his mother's Vespa scooter against friends, before graduating to his own Norton at the age of 19. After completing his National Service, Cevert switched his attention to cars. In 1966 he completed a training course at the Le Mans school, before enrolling Winfield Racing School at the Magny-Cours racing school. At Winfield, he won the Volant Shell scholarship as the top finisher among the students. The prize was an Alpine Formula Three.

His first season in F3, at the wheel of his prize Alpine, did not go well. He lacked the funds and experience to properly set up and maintain his car. After finding sponsorship for the 1968 season, Cevert traded in his Alpine for a more competitive Tecno car. With his new mount Cevert finally started to win races, and by the end of the season he was French Formula 3 Champion, just ahead of Jean-Pierre Jabouille.

After winning the French Formula 3 Championship, Cevert joined the works Tecno Formula Two team in 1969, and finished third overall, as well as driving in the F2 class of the 1969 German Grand Prix. At the time, Formula Two was an ideal training ground for ambitious drivers, as many top Grand Prix drivers also competed in the F2 class, when their Formula One schedules permitted. When Jackie Stewart had a hard time getting around Cevert in an F2 race at Crystal Palace the same year, Stewart told his team manager Ken Tyrrell to keep an eye on the young Frenchman. This personal recommendation was to pay off in 1970, as when Tyrrell needed a new driver at short notice Stewart's recommendation was still in his mind. Tyrrell later commented on the reason for Cevert's appointment to the Formula One team that "everybody said it was (French oil company and Tyrrell sponsor) Elf, but it was really what Jackie said about him."

Formula One

When Johnny Servoz-Gavin suddenly retired from the Tyrrell Formula One team three races into the 1970 season, Tyrrell called upon Cevert to be his number two driver, alongside defending World Champion Stewart. Over the next four seasons, Cevert became the veteran Stewart's devoted protégé. After making his debut at the Dutch Grand Prix at Zandvoort in Tyrrell's second customer March-Ford, he increased his pace and closed the gap to Stewart with virtually every race. He earned his first World Championship point by finishing sixth in the Italian Grand Prix at Monza.

In 1971, with the Tyrrell team now building their own cars, Cevert finished second in France and Germany, both times behind team leader Stewart. Then, in the season-ending United States Grand Prix at the newly extended Watkins Glen race course, the Frenchman earned his first and only Grand Prix win:

Having started from fifth spot, Cevert took the lead from Stewart on lap 14 as the Scot's tires began to go off in the 100° heat. At about half-distance, Cevert finally began to struggle with the same understeer that had plagued Stewart much earlier. Jacky Ickx was closing, and his Firestones were getting better as the race went on. On lap 43, Ickx set the fastest lap of the race, and the gap was down to 2.2 seconds. Then, on lap 49, the alternator on Ickx's Ferrari fell off, punching a hole in the gearbox and spilling oil all over the track! Denny Hulme's McLaren hit the oil and spun into the barrier, bending his front suspension. Hulme was standing beside the track when Cevert came by and also slid off and hit the barrier, but he kept going, now 29 seconds in the lead! Cevert coasted home, taking both hands off the wheel to wave as he crossed the line.

Cevert became only the second Frenchman to win a Formula One World Championship Grand Prix (Maurice Trintignant won at Monaco in 1955 and 1958), and received 50,000 U.S. dollars as award. It was the high point of his career, helping him take third place in the 1971 Drivers' Championship behind Stewart and Ronnie Peterson.

Great expectations for Cevert, Stewart and Tyrrell were not fulfilled in 1972, Cevert finished in the points only three times, with second places in Belgium and in the USA, and a fourth at his home race in France at the Clermont-Ferrand circuit. One bright spot in a disappointing year for Cevert was his second-place finish at the 24 hours of Le Mans, driving a Matra-Simca 670 with New Zealand's Howden Ganley.

Death
In 1973, the Tyrrell team was back on top in Formula One and Cevert showed he was capable of running with Stewart at almost every race. He finished second six times, three times behind Stewart, who acknowledged that at times the Frenchman had been a very "obedient" teammate. As Cevert began to draw even with Stewart's driving abilities, the Scot was secretly planning to retire after the last race of the season in the United States. For the 1974 season, Cevert would be Tyrrell's team leader.

At Watkins Glen, with Stewart having already clinched his third World Championship, Cevert was killed during Saturday morning qualifying, while battling for pole position with Ronnie Peterson. In the fast right-left uphill combination called "The Esses", Cevert's car was a little too far over towards the left side of the track, getting a bump from the kerbs.  This made it swerve towards the right-hand side of the track, where it touched the track's signature powder blue safety barriers causing it to spin and crash into the barriers on the other side of the track at a near 90° angle, uprooting and lifting the barrier. Cevert died instantly of massive injuries inflicted by the barrier, which cut his body in half between his neck and hip.

Cevert had crashed violently in the uphill Esses heading onto the back of the circuit. Fighting the car as he went up the hill, he brushed the curb on the left, whipped across the track and hit the guardrail on the right. The car began to spin, and he swerved back across the track at 150 mph and hit the outside guardrail almost head-on, Stewart said.

Jackie Stewart was one of the last on the scene of Cevert's accident and said later "They [the marshals] had left him [in the car], because he was so clearly dead." Stewart immediately left the scene of the accident and returned to the pits. 

Word of the severity of the crash gradually reached the pit area.  Footage shows track personnel and members of other teams, including Lotus owner Colin Chapman heading for the Tyrrell pit where Stewart parked his car.  Chapman was told by Lotus team manager Peter Warr that Cevert was the driver involved and that it was "very bad".  When Stewart exited his car, Chapman apparently deduced simply from his expression that it was a fatal accident. The Lotus team boss shook his head and stated mournfully, "Cevert...bloody hell."  He then sighed and started walking slowly back to the Lotus pits.

Emerson Fittipaldi parked his car shortly thereafter and immediately got out without speaking.  He later called Cevert's death, "One of the saddest [days] of my career."

Because of Cevert's death, Tyrrell withdrew its entry for this GP, and Stewart did not run what had been planned to be his final, and 100th, race.

Cevert was 29 years and 224 days old. He is buried in the Cimetière de Vaudelnay in the village of Vaudelnay, Maine-et-Loire.

Cause of the accident analysed by Stewart
When practice resumed, Stewart went out on the track in his car on a personal fact-finding mission. His conclusion was that his own preference was to take The Esses complex in fourth gear in the Tyrrell, hence he would be at the low end of the engine's rev range, making the car more tractable and less nervous (in exchange for a bit less throttle response).  Cevert, however, preferred to use third gear and be at the top end of his engine's power range: it was always something of a compromise because of the need to accelerate through the combination of corners. Stewart noted that the Tyrrell always felt jumpy through this section of the Watkins Glen track owing to its short wheelbase; he felt that this was somewhat counteracted by driving in the higher gear even though this meant a time penalty if he got his line wrong through the corner.

A film documentary of the time, shot minutes before the start of the fatal practice session, captures Stewart and Cevert in a spirited debate on exactly this point.  Another accident occurred at the same circuit a year later in the 1974 USA Grand Prix when another young Formula One driver, Helmuth Koinigg, died when his car went straight into the barrier at turn 7. As a response to Cevert's and Koinigg's accidents, a chicane was added in 1975 in order to slow the cars through the "Esses". The chicane was removed in 1985 after the track lost its Formula One race in 1981.

Films
The 2013 film Rush portrays a composite of Cevert's qualifying fatal accident, combining what appears to be the remains of a blue liveried 1973 Tyrrell 006 with the configuration of Helmuth Koinigg's accident while driving the Surtees TS16 in the 1974 race.

The 2013 documentary 1: Life on the Limit documents Cevert's fatal accident in 1973.

Cevert was extensively profiled and interviewed in the Formula One documentary, The Quick and the Dead.

Racing record

Career summary

 Ineligible for Formula One points, because Cevert drove with a Formula Two car.

Complete Formula One World Championship results
(key) (Races in italics indicate fastest lap)

 Ineligible for Formula One points, because Cevert drove with a Formula Two car.

Non-Championship results
(key) (Races in bold indicate pole position)
(Races in italics indicate fastest lap)

24 Hours of Le Mans results

Winner Volant Shell 1966
French Formula 3 Champion 1968
Third in the Formula 2 European Championship 1969
Third in the Formula 1 Drivers' World Championship 1971
Second in the 24 hours of Le Mans 1972
Winner in Donnybrook, Can-Am 1972
Winner of 1000km of Paris 1970

See also
List of select Jewish racing drivers

References

External links

Hamilton, Maurice, Ken Tyrrell: The Authorised Biography, HarperCollinsWillow 2002, .
Team Tyrrell Drivers – 1971
Grand Prix Encyclopedia
8W – Tyrrell in 1973
Atlas F1 Bulletin Board with 3 photographs of Cevert's grave at Vaudelnay
 

1944 births
1973 deaths
French racing drivers
French Formula One drivers
Tyrrell Formula One drivers
Formula One race winners
24 Hours of Le Mans drivers
European Formula Two Championship drivers
French Formula Three Championship drivers
World Sportscar Championship drivers
24 Hours of Daytona drivers
Racing drivers who died while racing
Sports deaths in New York (state)
French people of Russian-Jewish descent
Racing drivers from Paris